Scott Morphett (born 24 March 1965) is a former Australian rules footballer who played for Geelong in the Victorian Football League (VFL) and Woodville-West Torrens in the South Australian National Football League (SANFL).

Morphett had to wait until the final round of the 1985 VFL season, against Fitzroy at Victoria Park, to make his debut. Geelong won the game by 23 points and Morphett kicked a goal.

He was let go by the club without adding to his one appearance and ended up at West Torrens, with whom he was the 'Best and Fairest' winner in 1989. His club merged with Woodville to form Woodville-West Torrens in 1991 and he took out their inaugural Club Champion award. This was on the back of his Ken Farmer Medal winning season up forward where he kicked 99 goals to top the league's goal-kicking. Morphett was again the club's leading goal-kicker the following season after kicking 52 goals and also in 1996, having shared the honour in 1995. He is the full-forward in the official Woodville-West Torrens 'Team of the Decade'.

Not only was Morphett a good footballer, but an outstanding cricketer who was tipped for State honours if he chose that sport instead of Australian rules football.

References

Holmesby, Russell and Main, Jim (2007). The Encyclopedia of AFL Footballers. 7th ed. Melbourne: Bas Publishing.

1965 births
Living people
Geelong Football Club players
West Torrens Football Club players
Woodville-West Torrens Football Club players
Australian rules footballers from New South Wales
New South Wales Australian rules football State of Origin players